Dəmirçilər, Qazakh may refer to:
Dəmirçilər (41° 05' N 45° 16' E), Qazakh, Azerbaijan
Dəmirçilər (41° 17' N 45° 11' E), Qazakh, Azerbaijan